Benjamin Isaac Diskin (born August 25, 1982) is an American actor who was affiliated in Studiopolis, Bang Zoom!, SDI Media, VSI Los Angeles, and NYAV Post.

Early life
Diskin was born in Los Angeles County, California to a Jewish family.

Career
In 1991, Diskin won the "Outstanding Young Ensemble Cast in a Motion Picture" Young Artist Award for his role of Sylvester in Kindergarten Cop.

In 1993, when he was about 11 years old, he provided the voice of Junior Healy in the USA Network animated series Problem Child. He would later voice characters in animation, such as Eugene in Hey Arnold!, Numbuh 1 and Numbuh 2 in Codename: Kids Next Door, Eddie Brock and Venom in The Spectacular Spider-Man, Hahn in Avatar: The Last Airbender, and M'Comm M'orzz / Ma'alefa'ak in Young Justice. As of 2018, he has voiced both Gonzo and Rizzo in the revival version of Muppet Babies.

In anime, notable roles he played include Arashi Fuuma and Sai in Naruto and Naruto: Shippuden respectively, Kai Miyagusuku and Katao in Blood+, Shoutmon and Cutemon in Digimon Fusion, Joseph Joestar in JoJo's Bizarre Adventure, Gurio Umino in the Viz Media dub of Sailor Moon, Kensuke Aida in Neon Genesis Evangelion, Char Aznable in Mobile Suit Gundam: The Origin, Death Gun in Sword Art Online, Ban in The Seven Deadly Sins, Satoru Fujinuma in Erased, Knuckle Bine in Hunter x Hunter, and Jack in Beastars. He voiced the Disney character Stitch in the English versions of Stitch! and Stitch & Ai, taking over from the character's creator and original voice actor Chris Sanders. In 2018, he voiced Haida in the English dub of the Netflix original series Aggretsuko.

In video games, he voiced Eric Sparrow in Tony Hawk's Underground and its direct sequel Tony Hawk's Underground 2, Young Xehanort from the Kingdom Hearts series, Jared Miller in Halo 4, Jusis Albarea in The Legend of Heroes: Trails of Cold Steel series, Mega Man in Mega Man 11, and had two major roles in Fire Emblem: Three Houses: Lorenz Hellman Gloucester and Caspar von Bergliez. In 2018 he voiced Victor in Mr. Love Queen's choice.  He also voice the chatty Khajiit Captain Za’ji of the Pounce in Elder Scrolls Online.

Diskin has also appeared as an actor in The Wonder Years, Mr. Saturday Night, Baby Boom and Just Like Dad.

On May 4, 2019, Diskin won the "Outstanding Performer in a Preschool Animated Program" Daytime Emmy award for his role of Gonzo and Rizzo in Muppet Babies.

In July 2019, Diskin was one of the Guests of Honor at the annual Anthrocon furry convention in Pittsburgh.

Filmography

Anime

Western animation

Films

Live-action

Video games

Awards and nominations

Notes

References

External links
 
 
 

1982 births
Living people
American male child actors
American male video game actors
American male voice actors
Daytime Emmy Award winners
Jewish American male actors
Male actors from Los Angeles
20th-century American male actors
21st-century American male actors